TVTEL (TVTEL Comunicações, S.A.) was a Portuguese digital satellite and cable pay television service provider. The satellite service started on June 26, 2007, and it was on the Eurobird 9 satellite, broadcasting FTA and Conax-encrypted channels for the entire Europe. It was bought by ZON Multimédia in early 2009 and subsequently closed by it by merging its operations with ZON in late 2009.

Sport TV controversy
Around February 2007, SportTV stopped broadcasting to TVTEL subscribers, causing a major outcry. SportTV justified the move by stating that TVTEL hadn't already start broadcasting exclusively with digital encryption. TVTEL later placed a caption on the channel saying "A SportTV não deixa que a TVTEL cresca, por que será?" (SportTV doesn't allow TVTEL to grow, how come?). It is worth mentioning that SportTV is 50% owned by former competitor (then its new owner) ZON TVCabo.

This controversy was somewhat similar to that of Virgin Media vs BSkyB.

External links 
 New Official Site 
 Old Official Site 

Direct broadcast satellite services
Internet service providers of Portugal
Portuguese-language television networks
Telecommunications companies established in 1999
Mass media companies established in 1999
1999 establishments in Portugal
Companies based in Porto